Adrienne Johnson may refer to:

 Adrienne Johnson Kiriakis, a character on NBC's daytime drama Days of Our Lives
 Adrienne Johnson (basketball) (born 1974), American basketball player